Noll Glacier is a glacier, nearly 20 nautical miles (37 km) long, draining northeast from Jones Nunatak in central Wilson Hills. The glacier turns northwest at Wegert Bluff and enters the lower part of Tomilin Glacier before the latter debouches into the sea. Mapped by United States Geological Survey (USGS) from surveys and U.S. Navy air photos, 1960–64. Named by Advisory Committee on Antarctic Names (US-ACAN) for Maj. Edmund P. Noll, United States Marine Corps (USMC), Cargo Officer and LC-130 Aircraft Commander with U.S. Navy Squadron VX-6 during Operation Deep Freeze 1968. Returning from the war in Vietnam in June 1966 he deployed to Antarctica in October that year completing deployments with VX6 for the 1966–67 and 1967–68 season on the ice.  He commanded the winter fly-in in 1967 and was co-pilot on the rescue flight from the U,S, base at McMurdo to Haley Bay, the British base across the continent for which he was awarded a single mission AIR Medal.  Major Noll completed his military service, retiring in 1988 as a colonel.

At its western margin is Burt Rocks.

Glaciers of Oates Land